Holly Lawford-Smith is a philosopher, scholar, researcher, author and  Associate Professor in Political Philosophy, University of Melbourne.

Biography

Lawford-Smith was born in Taupō, New Zealand and completed her BA (Hons) and MA at the University of Otago in Dunedin, New Zealand. She completed a PhD at the Australian National University (ANU) in Canberra in 2010. She then completed post doctoral scholarships at Centre for Applied Philosophy and Public Ethics CAPPE, Charles Sturt University and then with the School of Philosophy at ANU (2022-2012). Lawford-Smith then started a permanent job as a lecturer in Philosophy at the University of Sheffield.

Since 2017 Lawford-Smith has worked at the University of Melbourne where she is currently Associate Professor in Political Philosophy in the School of Historical and Philosophical Studies.
Lawford-Smith's work is based in social, moral, and political philosophy, with a primary interest in radical feminism and gender critical feminism.

In February 2021, Lawford-Smith launched a website called "No Conflict, They Said" that collects anonymous, unverified stories of the purported impacts of transgender women using women-only spaces. Concerned that the website used isolated and specific (unverified) examples of misconduct to represent transgender women generally as a threat or nuisance, a number of academics from her institution signed an open letter to the University of Melbourne's leadership condemning the website as transphobic, and arguing that it "contravenes the University's Appropriate Workplace Behaviour Policy and raises serious questions about research integrity at the University." In February 2021 The Sydney Morning Herald stated that the site was calling for cis women to share stories about feeling threatened by trans women, that most narratives referred to trans women as "men" and that many of the narratives were about encounters in toilets.

In May 2022, Oxford University Press (OUP) published Lawford-Smith's book, Gender-Critical Feminism, despite petitions objecting to its publication. The OUP responded to these petitions that Lawford-Smith's work is rigorous scholarship and calling it not polemical as the petitions claim. Gender-Critical Feminism was released in the U.K. on 12 May 2022.

Lawford-Smith is also on the editorial board of The Journal of Political Philosophy and Journal of Controversial Ideas. She is also a monthly contributor at Quillette.

Selected works
 
 
 Lawford-Smith, Holly (2022). Gender-Critical Feminism. Oxford University Press. .

References

External links
 Official website
 University of Melbourne bio

 Google Scholar Page

Living people
Academic staff of the University of Melbourne
Australian feminists
Australian women's rights activists
Australian feminist writers
Activists from Melbourne
1982 births